The Jaynes Islands are a cluster of small islands located  west of the southwest end of Canisteo Peninsula, in the Amundsen Sea off Antarctica. They were mapped by the United States Geological Survey from surveys and U.S. Navy air photos, 1960–66, and were named by the Advisory Committee on Antarctic Names for James T. Jaynes, U.S. Navy, an equipment operator at Byrd Station in 1966.

See also 
 List of Antarctic and sub-Antarctic islands

References

Islands of Marie Byrd Land